Peter Erne Baume, AC (born 30 January 1935) is a retired Australian doctor and politician. He was a Senator for New South Wales from 1974 to 1991, representing the Liberal Party. He served as Minister for Aboriginal Affairs (1980–1982) and Minister for Education (1982–1983) in the Fraser Government.

Early life and education
Baume was born in Sydney, New South Wales and educated at North Sydney Boys High School and Sydney Grammar School.

Baume graduated in 1959 with a Bachelor of Medicine and Surgery from the University of Sydney and then studied gastroenterology in the United Kingdom and the United States.

He received an MB, BS at the University of Sydney in 1969. He was in private practice as a gastroentologist and physician at Royal North Shore Hospital before entering the Parliament of Australia. He was also a clinical lecturer at the University of Sydney.

Political career
Baume was elected to the Senate for New South Wales, representing the Liberal Party at the 1974 election. As a backbencher he chaired the Senate Standing Committee on Social Welfare, which produced two reports: "Drug problems in Australia—an intoxicated society?" (1977) and "Through a glass darkly: evaluation in Australian health and welfare services" (1979). He was the Minister for Aboriginal Affairs from November 1980 to May 1982 and Minister for Health from 20 April 1982 to 7 May 1982 following Michael MacKellar's resignation as minister.  He was then Minister for Education until the Fraser government's defeat in the March 1983 election.  He was the parliamentary representative on the Council of the Australian National University from February 1986 until his resignation from parliament.

In 1987 when Baume was Shadow Minister for the Status of Women he contravened Liberal Party policy by voting for a bill giving equal employment opportunity in some government-owned bodies. He considered he was "... finished in the Liberal Party. It is true that one is allowed to cross the floor in the Liberal Party of Australia, but my philosophical liberal principles sat poorly with the increasingly dominant radical conservatism of others. It was time again for a change of career." He resigned from parliament in January 1991.

Baume is a cousin of former Liberal Senator Michael Baume.

After politics
Baume was Professor of Community Medicine at the University of New South Wales (UNSW) from 1991 to 2000 and studied euthanasia, drug policy and evaluation.  Since 2000, he has been an honorary research associate with the Social Policy Research Centre at UNSW.  He works as a facilitator of bi-weekly scenario groups for the first and second year of the university's medical program.

He was Chancellor of the Australian National University from 1994 to 2006. He has also been Commissioner of the Australian Law Reform Commission, Deputy Chair of the Australian National Council on AIDS and Foundation Chair of the Australian Sports Anti-Doping Authority from 1991 to 1998. He was appointed a director of Sydney Water in 1998 following the discovery of cryptosporidium in Sydney's water supply.

Awards 
Baume was appointed an Officer of the Order of Australia in January 1992 in recognition of service to the Australian Parliament. In June 2008 he was appointed a Companion of the Order of Australia. He received an honorary doctorate from the Australian National University in December 2004. in August 2016 Baume was recognised in the Disability Employment Australia Hall of Fame for "his role in the 1994 Review of the Commonwealth Disability Services Program" (later dubbed the Baume Review).

The ANU 'Peter Baume Award', recognises "eminent achievement and merit of the highest order". It was first conferred in 2004.

Baume is a Distinguished Fellow of the Royal Society of New South Wales.

Personal life
Baume married Jennifer Tuson in 1958 and they have one son Ian and one daughter Sarah.  
Sarah has three children Rachel, Annabelle, Rosie.

Notes

Members of the Cabinet of Australia
Liberal Party of Australia members of the Parliament of Australia
Members of the Australian Senate for New South Wales
Members of the Australian Senate
People educated at Sydney Grammar School
1935 births
Living people
Companions of the Order of Australia
People educated at North Sydney Boys High School
Chancellors of the Australian National University
20th-century Australian politicians
Academic staff of the University of New South Wales
Australian Ministers for Health